Kurson is a surname, likely a variant of the surname Curzon. Notable people with the surname include:

Jane Kurson, American film editor
Ken Kurson (born 1968), American political consultant, writer, journalist, and former musician
Robert Kurson (born 1963), American author

See also
Curson (disambiguation)
Curzon (disambiguation)